Speech coding is an application of data compression of digital audio signals containing speech. Speech coding uses speech-specific parameter estimation using audio signal processing techniques to model the speech signal, combined with generic data compression algorithms to represent the resulting modeled parameters in a compact bitstream.

Some applications of speech coding are mobile telephony and voice over IP (VoIP). The most widely used speech coding technique in mobile telephony is linear predictive coding (LPC), while the most widely used in VoIP applications are the LPC and modified discrete cosine transform (MDCT) techniques.

The techniques employed in speech coding are similar to those used in audio data compression and audio coding where knowledge in psychoacoustics is used to transmit only data that is relevant to the human auditory system. For example, in voiceband speech coding, only information in the frequency band 400 to 3500 Hz is transmitted but the reconstructed signal is still adequate for intelligibility.

Speech coding differs from other forms of audio coding in that speech is a simpler signal than most other audio signals, and a lot more statistical information is available about the properties of speech. As a result, some auditory information that is relevant in audio coding can be unnecessary in the speech coding context. In speech coding, the most important criterion is preservation of intelligibility and pleasantness of speech, with a constrained amount of transmitted data. In addition, most speech applications require low coding delay, as long coding delays interfere with speech interaction.

Categories 
Speech coders are of two types:
 Waveform coders
 Time-domain: PCM, ADPCM
 Frequency-domain: sub-band coding, ATRAC
 Vocoders
 Linear predictive coding (LPC)
 Formant coding

Sample companding viewed as a form of speech coding 
The A-law and μ-law algorithms (G.711) used in traditional PCM digital telephony can be seen as an earlier precursor of speech encoding, requiring only 8 bits per sample but giving effectively 12 bits of resolution. The logarithmic companding laws are consistent with human hearing perception in that a low-amplitude noise is heard along a low-amplitude speech signal but is masked by a high-amplitude one. Although this would generate unacceptable distortion in a music signal, the peaky nature of speech waveforms, combined with the simple frequency structure of speech as a periodic waveform having a single fundamental frequency with occasional added noise bursts, make these very simple instantaneous compression algorithms acceptable for speech.

A wide variety of other algorithms were tried at the time, mostly delta modulation variants, but after careful consideration, the A-law/μ-law algorithms were chosen by the designers of the early digital telephony systems. At the time of their design, their 33% bandwidth reduction for a very low complexity made an excellent engineering compromise. Their audio performance remains acceptable, and there was no need to replace them in the stationary phone network.

In 2008, G.711.1 codec, which has a scalable structure, was standardized by ITU-T. The input sampling rate is 16 kHz.

Modern speech compression 
Much of the later work in speech compression was motivated by military research into digital communications for secure military radios, where very low data rates were required to allow effective operation in a hostile radio environment. At the same time, far more processing power was available, in the form of VLSI circuits, than was available for earlier compression techniques. As a result, modern speech compression algorithms could use far more complex techniques than were available in the 1960s to achieve far higher compression ratios.

These techniques were available through the open research literature to be used for civilian applications, allowing the creation of digital mobile phone networks with substantially higher channel capacities than the analog systems that preceded them.

The most widely used speech coding algorithms are based on linear predictive coding (LPC). In particular, the most common speech coding scheme is the LPC-based code-excited linear prediction (CELP) coding, which is used for example in the GSM standard. In CELP, the modeling is divided in two stages, a linear predictive stage that models the spectral envelope and a code-book-based model of the residual of the linear predictive model. In CELP, linear prediction coefficients (LPC) are computed and quantized, usually as line spectral pairs (LSPs). In addition to the actual speech coding of the signal, it is often necessary to use channel coding for transmission, to avoid losses due to transmission errors. In order to get the best overall coding results, speech coding and channel coding methods are chosen in pairs, with the more important bits in the speech data stream protected by more robust channel coding.

The modified discrete cosine transform (MDCT), a type of discrete cosine transform (DCT) algorithm, was adapted into a speech coding algorithm called LD-MDCT, used for the AAC-LD format introduced in 1999. MDCT has since been widely adopted in voice-over-IP (VoIP) applications, such as the G.729.1 wideband audio codec introduced in 2006, Apple's FaceTime (using AAC-LD) introduced in 2010, and the CELT codec introduced in 2011.

Opus is a free software audio coder. It combines both the MDCT (CELT) and LPC (SILK) audio compression algorithms, using the former for speech. It is widely used for VoIP calls in WhatsApp. The PlayStation 4 video game console also uses Opus for its PlayStation Network system party chat.

A number of codecs with even lower bitrates have been demonstrated. Codec2, which operates at bit rates as low as 450 bps, sees use in amateur radio. NATO currently uses MELPe, offering legible speech 600 bps (with one nonstandard variant halving the number). Lyra by Google takes an unusual machine learning approach, giving "almost eerie" quality at 3 kbps. Microsoft’s Satin also uses machine learning, but uses a higher tunable bitrate and is wideband.

Sub-fields
 Wideband audio coding
 Linear predictive coding (LPC)
 AMR-WB for WCDMA networks
 VMR-WB for CDMA2000 networks
 Speex, IP-MR, SILK and Opus for voice-over-IP (VoIP) and videoconferencing
 Modified discrete cosine transform (MDCT)
 AAC-LD, G.722.1, G.729.1, CELT and Opus for VoIP and videoconferencing
 Adaptive differential pulse-code modulation (ADPCM)
 G.722 for VoIP

 Narrowband audio coding
 LPC
 FNBDT for military applications
 SMV for CDMA networks
 Full Rate, Half Rate, EFR and AMR for GSM networks
 G.723.1, G.728, G.729, G.729.1 and iLBC for VoIP or videoconferencing
 ADPCM
 G.726 for VoIP
 Multi-Band Excitation (MBE)
 AMBE+ for digital mobile radio and satellite telephone
 Codec 2

See also 
 Digital signal processing
 Speech interface guideline
 Speech processing
 Speech synthesis
 Vector quantization

References

External links
 ITU-T Test Signals for Telecommunication Systems Test Samples
 ITU-T Perceptual evaluation of speech quality (PESQ) tool Sources